The national symbols of Sri Lanka are the national anthem, flag, emblem, flower, tree, bird, butterfly, gemstone and sport. They represent the country and its people within Sri Lanka and abroad as well as traditions, culture, history and geography. Several other symbols do not have official acknowledgment as national symbols but are considered national symbols at the local level.

The Constitution of the Democratic Socialist Republic of Sri Lanka sets out the national flag, the national anthem, the national day and the national language. The constitution was promulgated by the National State Assembly on 7 September 1978. On 14 November 1987 the Sri Lankan Parliament passed the Thirteenth Amendment to the Constitution of Sri Lanka, which made both Sinhala and Tamil the national languages.

National symbols

Unofficial 
Here are list of national symbols that have no official status.

See also 

 Outline of Sri Lanka
 Timeline of Sri Lankan history
 Lists of national symbols

Further reading

References